Admiral Bille may refer to:

Bendix Lasson Bille (1723–1784), Royal Danish Navy rear admiral
Daniel Ernst Bille (1711–1790), Royal Danish Navy rear admiral
Michael Bille (1680–1756) (1680–1756), Royal Danish Navy vice admiral
Michael Johannes Petronius Bille (born 1769), Royal Danish Navy vice admiral
Steen Andersen Bille (1751–1833) (1751–1833), Royal Danish Navy admiral
Steen Andersen Bille (1797–1883) (1797–1883), Royal Danish Navy vice admiral